John Sellers may refer to: 

John Sellers (scientist) (1728–1804), founding member of the American Philosophical Society
John Sellers (politician), member of the New Hampshire House of Representatives
Brother John Sellers (1924–1999), American gospel and folk singer 
Johnny Sellers (1937–2010), American jockey

See also
John Seller (1632–1697), English cartographer
Murder of Charlie Keever and Jonathan Sellers